Wairoa is a town in New Zealand.

Wairoa or Te Wairoa (Māori for Long water and The long water respectively) may also refer to:

New Zealand
Te Wairoa (iwi), a Māori tribal group
Te Wairoa, New Zealand, an abandoned village buried by the eruption of Mount Tarawera in 1886
Wairoa District in the Hawke's Bay Region
Wairoa River (disambiguation), various watercourses

Australia
Wairoa, Aldgate, a historic house in the Adelaide Hills

See also
Wairau (disambiguation)
Wairua (disambiguation)